John William Skinner (5 June 1917 – 12 April 1988) was an Australian rules footballer who played with Carlton in the Victorian Football League (VFL).

Skinner later served in the Australian Army during World War II.

Notes

External links 

Jack Skinner's profile at Blueseum

1917 births
Carlton Football Club players
1988 deaths
Australian rules footballers from Victoria (Australia)